Randell "Kydd" Jones is an American rapper, producer, and singer-songwriter from Austin, Texas.

Career

Jones performed at NXNE, The Brooklyn Hip-Hop Festival and Red Bull Sound Select in 2014 while producing for Kirko Bangz on Progression V. During 2015, he released two singles:  Patience and Blink Away with Sean Price; he also performed at the Billboard Hot 100 Fest at Jones Beach Theater. After being personally picked by Chuck D to open for The Hip Hop Gods Tour in Los Angeles at The Novo (formerly Club Nokia), Kydd opened for The Art Of Rap Fest at the Lakewood Amphitheatre in Atlanta during 2016. He released Sounds in My Head 2: The Righteous Edition later that year with features from Skyzoo, Yelawolf, Pac Div, A.Dd+, Cory Kendrix, Max Frost, GLC  & Tank Washington. Jones performed at SXSW and Austin City Limits Festival in both 2018 and in 2019 with Gary Clark Jr after releasing his album entitled Homecoming as well as an EP with producer Insightful of Soulection. He then followed that up by performing at Blues On The Green during 2020 and 2021 and collaborating with the Round Rock Express to honor native Austinite and Negro league baseball legend Willie Wells and the Austin Black Senators at Dell Diamond. In 2022, Kydd released his new album, Onyx D'Or and was honored in his hometown of Austin, Texas by having September 1st declared Kydd Jones Day.

References

External links
 

Living people
Musicians from Austin, Texas
Year of birth missing (living people)
American hip hop record producers
Singers from Texas
Songwriters from Texas
American contemporary R&B singers
American hip hop singers
African-American male rappers
Southern hip hop musicians
21st-century American singers
21st-century African-American male singers
African-American record producers
African-American songwriters
Alternative hip hop musicians
American hip hop musicians
21st-century American rappers
Record producers from Texas
Rappers from Austin
21st-century American male singers
American male songwriters